Acanthophila is a moth genus. It is here placed in subfamily Dichomeridinae of family Gelechiidae, although it is sometimes treated as junior synonym of Dichomeris.

Species
Subgenus Acanthophila
Acanthophila alacella (Zeller, 1839)
Acanthophila beljaevi Ponomarenko, 1998
Acanthophila bimaculata (Liu & Qian, 1994)
Acanthophila kuznetzovi Ponomarenko, 1998
Acanthophila liui (Li & Zheng, 1996)
Acanthophila lucistrialella M.G. Ponomarenko & Omelko, 2003
Acanthophila magnimaculata M.G. Ponomarenko & Omelko, 2003
Acanthophila pusillella M.G. Ponomarenko & Omelko, 2003
Acanthophila qinlingensis Li & Zheng, 1996
Acanthophila silvania M.G. Ponomarenko & Omelko, 2003
Acanthophila silvestrella M.G. Ponomarenko, 1998
Subgenus Mimomeris Povolný, 1978
Acanthophila latipennella (Rebel, 1937)
Acanthophila obscura (Li & Zheng, 1997)
Acanthophila vixidistinctella Ponomarenko & Omelko, 2003
incertae sedis
Acanthophila angustiptera (Li & Zheng, 1997)
Acanthophila imperviella M.G. Ponomarenko & Omelko, 2003
Acanthophila nyingchiensis (Li & Zheng, 1996)

References

 , 1998: New taxonomic data on Dichomeridinae (Lepidoptera: Gelechiidae) from the Russian Far East. Far Eastern Entomologist 67: 1-17. Full article: 
  & , 2003: Review of the genus Acanthophila Heinemann, 1870 (Lepidoptera: Gelechiidae). Far Eastern Entomologist 127: 1-24 

 
Dichomeridinae
Moth genera